The 2012 United States presidential election in Delaware took place on November 6, 2012, as part of the 2012 United States presidential election in which all 50 states plus the District of Columbia participated. Delaware voters chose three electors to represent them in the Electoral College via a popular vote pitting incumbent Democratic President Barack Obama and his running mate, Vice President Joe Biden, against Republican challenger and former Massachusetts Governor Mitt Romney and his running mate, Congressman Paul Ryan.

Obama easily carried Delaware by 18.63 points. Throughout the campaign, news organizations considered Delaware a state Obama would win, or a safe blue state. It has not been carried by a Republican presidential candidate since 1988, it has not been seriously contested by Republicans since 1992, and it is reckoned to be part of the blue wall, referring to the group of states that voted for the Democratic presidential nominee in every election from 1992 to 2012. Additionally, it is the home state of Obama's vice president, Joe Biden, who served as Senator there from 1973 to 2009.

Primaries

Democratic
The Democratic primary in Delaware was cancelled as President Obama was the only candidate to file for the ballot, and received Delaware's entire delegation.

Republican

The 2012 Delaware Republican presidential primary took place on April 24, 2012.

General election

Candidate ballot access
 Mitt Romney/Paul Ryan, Republican
 Barack Obama/Joseph Biden, Democratic
 Gary Johnson/James P. Gray, Libertarian
 Jill Stein/Cheri Honkala, Green
Write-in candidate access:
 Rocky Anderson/Luis J. Rodriguez, Justice

Results

By county

By congressional district
Due to the state's low population, only one congressional district is allocated. This district is called the At-Large district, because it covers the entire state, and thus is equivalent to the statewide election results.

See also 
 United States presidential elections in Delaware
 2012 Republican Party presidential debates and forums
 2012 Republican Party presidential primaries
 Results of the 2012 Republican Party presidential primaries
 Delaware Republican Party

References

External links
The Green Papers: for Delaware
The Green Papers: Major state elections in chronological order

United States president
2012
Delaware